British Steel is the sixth studio album by English heavy metal band Judas Priest, released on 11 April 1980 by Columbia Records. It was the band's first album to feature Dave Holland on drums.

Overview
British Steel saw the band reprise the commercial sound they had established on Killing Machine. This time, they abandoned some of the dark lyrical themes which had been prominent on their previous releases, but some of it still remains. In a June 2017 appearance on Sirius radio podcast "Rolling Stone Music Now," Rob Halford said the band may have been inspired by AC/DC on some tracks after supporting them on a European tour in 1979. British Steel was recorded in December 1979 at Tittenhurst Park, home of former Beatle Ringo Starr, after a false start at Startling Studios, also located on the grounds of Tittenhurst Park, due to the band preferring Starr's house to the recording studio itself. Digital sampling was not yet widely available at the time of recording, so the band used analog recording of smashing milk bottles to be included in "Breaking the Law", as well as various sounds in "Metal Gods" produced by billiard cues and trays of cutlery. It is the first Judas Priest album to feature drummer Dave Holland, and it was released in the UK at a discount price of £3.99, with the advertisements in the music press bearing the legend "British Steal". The songs "Breaking the Law", "United", and "Living After Midnight" were released as singles.

The album was remastered in 2001 with two bonus tracks added. Bonus studio track "Red, White, and Blue" was written in the sessions for the Twin Turbos album (which would become Turbo) and recorded at Compass Point Studios in Nassau in July 1985. The second bonus track, a live performance of "Grinder", was recorded on 5 May 1984, in Los Angeles during the Defenders of the Faith tour.

In 2009, Judas Priest kicked off their 30th anniversary tour in the US by playing British Steel live in its entirety for the first time. The only other Judas Priest albums of which all the songs have been performed live are Defenders of the Faith and Rocka Rolla, but neither of them were played in the original LP running order or during the same tour (though the original US debut LP had a different running order than the UK version).

The 30th anniversary release of the album came with a DVD and CD of a live show recorded on 17 August 2009 at the Seminole Hard Rock Arena in Hollywood, Florida as part of the British Steel 30th Anniversary tour. The live versions of all the British Steel tracks from this release were also made available as downloadable content for the Rock Band video game series beginning 11 May 2010.

Critical reception 

The album received positive reviews. AllMusic gave the album five stars out of five, explaining that the album "kick-started heavy metal's glory days of the 1980s", and saying that "There are still uptempo slices of metallic mayhem bookending the album in 'Rapid Fire' and 'Steeler', plus effective moodier pieces in 'Metal Gods.

Rolling Stone and BBC Music rated the album favourably, and PopMatters gave the album an 8 out of 10 rating. In 2017, it was ranked third on Rolling Stone list of "100 Greatest Metal Albums of All Time". The album was also included in the book 1001 Albums You Must Hear Before You Die.

During an interview with Wall of Sound's Educate Ebony podcast, Max Cavalera stated British Steel is the "essential thrash metal" album everyone needs to hear and says "I’m sure you can ask Metallica, if it wasn’t for British Steel they wouldn’t be here."

Track listing

1980 U.S. release

Other releases

30th Anniversary Edition – bonus live CD/DVD

Personnel
Judas Priest
Rob Halford – vocals
K. K. Downing – guitars
Glenn Tipton – guitars
Ian Hill – bass
Dave Holland – drums

Production
Produced by Tom Allom
Engineered by Lou Austin
Cut by Ray Staff
Cover design by Rosław Szaybo
Photography by R. Elsdale and R. Ellis

Charts

Certifications

References

1980 albums
Albums produced by Tom Allom
Columbia Records albums
Judas Priest albums